The 2001 U.S. Figure Skating Championships took place between January 14 and 21, 2001 at the FleetCenter in Boston, Massachusetts. Medals were awarded in four colors: gold (first), silver (second), bronze (third), and pewter (fourth) in four disciplines – men's singles, ladies' singles, pair skating, and ice dancing – across three levels: senior, junior, and novice.

The event was used to determine the U.S. teams for the 2001 World Championships, 2001 Four Continents Championships, and the 2001 World Junior Championships.

Competition notes
 Frank Carroll coached both the senior men's and senior ladies' champions, the first time one coach had trained two senior champions since Richard Callaghan did it in 1997 with Tara Lipinski and Todd Eldredge. Eldredge placed second here.
 Sibling pairs team Danielle Hartsell / Steve Hartsell were nearly forced to withdraw before the event after he fell on his head during practice. He required 12 stitches, but they went on to win the short program and the bronze medal overall.

Senior results

Men

Ladies

Pairs

Ice dancing

Junior results

Men

Ladies

Pairs

Ice dancing

Novice results

Men

Ladies

Pairs

Ice dancing

International team selections

World Championships

Four Continents Championships

World Junior Championships

External links
 2001 U.S. Figure Skating Championships
 2001 State Farm U.S. Figure Skating Championships

U.S. Figure Skating Championships
United States Figure Skating Championships, 2001
Figure Skating
United States Figure Skating
January 2001 sports events in the United States